is a Japanese female curler.

Teams

References

External links

Living people
1991 births
Japanese female curlers

Competitors at the 2011 Winter Universiade
Competitors at the 2013 Winter Universiade
Place of birth missing (living people)
20th-century Japanese women
21st-century Japanese women